The Way of War is a 2009 American film directed by John Carter and starring Cuba Gooding Jr., John Terry, Lance Reddick, J. K. Simmons, Clarence Williams III, and Jaclyn DeSantis. The screenplay was written by John Carter and Scott Schafe. Filming took place largely in Baton Rouge, Louisiana.

Plot 
Special Activities Division Paramilitary operative David Wolfe (Cuba Gooding Jr.) stumbles upon an international conspiracy connecting presidential cabinet members to a Middle Eastern terrorist plot. Wanting to expose the truth, Wolfe defies orders to remain off the field, and returns to the US as an army of one fighting for American security and integrity.

Cast
 Cuba Gooding Jr. as David Wolfe
 J. K. Simmons as Sergeant Mitchell
 Clarence Williams III as Mac
 Vernel Bagneris as Samir
 Lance Reddick as The Black Man
 John Terry as the Secretary of Defense
 Jaclyn DeSantis as Sophia Wolfe, David's wife

Reception 
The film received mostly negative reviews when it was released direct-to-DVD in 2008. "The story is unevenly pieced together through cheap flashbacks, leaving the audience in the dark for nearly two-thirds of the film until, finally, things start to come together, sort of. But by then, sadly, it's too little, too late. The mystery is lost in a sea of weary ideas and well-worn plot devices," said one reviewer for IGN.

References

External links

2009 films
American action films
2009 action films
2000s English-language films
2000s American films